Neil Tabone (born 1 October 1997) is a Maltese footballer who plays as a midfielder for Żejtun Corinthians and the Malta national team.

Career
Tabone made his international debut for Malta on 11 November 2020 in a friendly match against Liechtenstein.

Career statistics

International

References

External links
 Neil Tabone league statistics
 
 

1997 births
Living people
Maltese footballers
Malta youth international footballers
Malta under-21 international footballers
Malta international footballers
Association football midfielders
Żejtun Corinthians F.C. players
Floriana F.C. players
Maltese Premier League players